Morani is a village in the municipality of Studeničani, North Macedonia.

Demographics
According to the 2021 census, the village had a total of 2.595 inhabitants. Ethnic groups in the village include:

Albanians 2.396
Macedonians 78
Romani 46
Turks 6
Serbs 8 
Others 61

References

Villages in Studeničani Municipality
Albanian communities in North Macedonia